Pedro Gómez Valderrama (13 February 1923 – 7 May 1992) was a Colombian lawyer, writer, and career diplomat who served as the 1st Ambassador of Colombia to the Soviet Union and as Ambassador of Colombia to Spain.

Personal life
Born on 13 February 1932 in Bucaramanga, Santander, he was the eldest child of Pedro Alejandro Gómez Naranjo and Lucía Valderrama, his younger siblings were: Hernando, José Luis, Carmen Lucía, and Mariá Cecilia. He took after his father, who was a lawyer, politician, writer, and former Governor of Santander. He married Beatriz Vila Londoño with whom he had three children: Pedro Alejandro, Carlos Alberto, and Marcela.

Selected works

See also
 Hernando Téllez

References

1923 births
1992 deaths
People from Bucaramanga
National University of Colombia alumni
Academic staff of the Free University of Colombia
20th-century Colombian lawyers
Colombian male writers
Demonologists
Ambassadors of Colombia to Russia
Ambassadors of Colombia to Spain
Colombian Ministers of National Education
Colombian Ministers of Government